The Zöbing Formation is a geologic formation in Austria. It preserves fossils dating back to the Permian period.

See also

 List of fossiliferous stratigraphic units in Austria

References
 

Geologic formations of Austria
Permian System of Europe
Permian Austria